Tetartemorion ( tetartēmorion) is the name of a silver coin minted in Ancient Greece, valued at 1/4 of an obol. Its name means "quarter part", from tetarton, meaning a fourth, and morion part, portion.

The weight at Athens was about 0.15-0.18 grams.

Coins of ancient Greece